The 2020–21 season was the 30th season of competitive association football in Ukraine since dissolution of the Soviet Union.

National teams

Ukraine national football team

Friendlies

UEFA Nations League

Group 4

2022 FIFA World Cup

Group D

UEFA Euro 2020

Group stage
Group C

Ranking of third-placed teams

Knockout phase

Round of 16

Quarter-finals

Ukraine U-21 national football team

UEFA European Under-21 Championship

Group 8

Ukraine women's national football team

UEFA Women's Euro 2022

Group I

Play-offs

Matches

|}

UEFA competitions

UEFA Champions League

Qualifying phase and play-off round

Third qualifying round

|}

Play-off round

|}

Group stage

Group B

Group G

UEFA Europa League

Qualifying rounds

Second qualifying round

|}

Third qualifying round

|}

Group stage

Group G

Knockout phase

Round of 32

|}

Round of 16

|}

UEFA Youth League

UEFA Champions League Path

Shakhtar Donetsk
Dynamo Kyiv

UEFA Women's Champions League

Qualifying round

First qualifying round

|}

Second qualifying round

|}

Knockout phase

Round of 32

|}

Men's club football

Note: For all scratched clubs, see section Clubs removed for more details

Premier League

PFL League 1 (First League)

PFL League 2 (Second League)

Group A

Group B

Cup competitions

Ukrainian Cup

Super Cup

Women's club football

Note: For the scratched club, see section Clubs removed for more details

Vyshcha Liha

Managerial changes 
This is a list of managerial changes among Ukrainian professional football clubs (top two leagues):

Clubs removed 
 Second cub teams Avanhard-2 Kramatorsk and Chornomorets-2 Odesa did not apply for participation in the Second League this season.
 FC Kalush withdrew soon after the start of the season without playing a single game

Notes

References 

 
Seasons in Ukrainian football
2020 sport-related lists
2021 sport-related lists